Pi Alpha Phi Fraternity, Inc. (also Pi Alpha Phi or PAPhi) is an American university-level fraternity.  It was founded in 1929 at the University of California, Berkeley, and is the oldest active Asian-American interest fraternity in the nation. As of 2019, the fraternity has 11 active chapters and 4 colonies nationwide.  Pi Alpha Phi Fraternity is a member of the National APIDA Panhellenic Association.

History
In 1928, three members of the class of 1930 conceived the idea to form a fraternity to serve the several hundred students of Chinese descent at the University of California, Berkeley. Wing C. Chan, from the Central California town of Oroville; Dong Wing Tom, from San Francisco; and Elmer Leong from Berkeley, did much of the preliminary work towards the formation of the Fraternity. In the fall of 1928, the three approached Tim Jang, a freshman starting his first year at the university to join.

On , the six founding fathers signed the fraternity's constitution in both Chinese and English and officially established Pi Alpha Phi at the University of California, Berkeley. The six founders were D. Wing Tom, Wing Chan, Elmer Leong, Chack Chan, Tim Jang, and George Lee.

Founders
The founding fathers of Pi Alpha Phi hailed primarily from the state of California. Elmer Leong, George Lee, and D. Wing Tom were from the San Francisco Bay area. Tim Jang, Wing Chan, and his younger brother Chack Chan came from the Central Valley region of California. All were born in America with the exception of Wing Chan, who came from China at an early age.

The men studied science and engineering, which was considered a better path to employment after graduation since discrimination prevented most Asians from entering into law, medicine or other graduate disciplines.

Their challenges grew as they found out that student lodging was often not rented to those of Asian heritage. It was especially difficult for Tim, Wing and Chack from the Central Valley for whom commuting was not an option. The problem was solved by the goodwill of a sympathetic German woman known as Mother Tusch, who also had been a victim of racism. The seeds of brotherhood were planted in the cabin she rented to Wing, Elmer and D. Wing Tom behind her house near Sather Gate.

The six men proceeded with their college careers, engaging in academic and social events, as well as athletics. Elmer Leong even joined the university track team. They found great comfort and camaraderie in their small group but felt compelled to turn their group into more than a circle of friends, more than a club, more than a social gathering. They decided to form a formal fraternity of brothers that would bind them forever; a fraternity that would break the status quo and seek recognition by the university system.

Following graduation in the early 1930s, the founding fathers found life difficult. The country was in the midst of the Great Depression and discrimination against those of Asian heritage for jobs was even more prevalent. Four of the six—Wing Chan, Chack Chan, D. Wing Tom and George Lee—went to southern China to find employment and new lives. Tim and Elmer decided to stay in America to continue their education and start a career despite the difficult circumstances. The four in China prospered, with Wing teaching chemistry at a university in Canton, Chack Chan working in the local aircraft industry, George Lee pursuing a medical degree, and all four became married and started their families.

In 1937, with the advent of war in China, all returned home to America with the exception of Wing, who returned after World War II. During wartime, each of the founding fathers made contributions to their country. For example, Tim enlisted in the U.S. Navy Seabees. He served as a construction corpsman for the 132nd Naval Construction Battalion in the Pacific. Chack put his engineering skills to use as a draftsman at the famed Henry J. Kaiser naval shipyard in Richmond, California, where many of the country's great warships were built.

Mission statement 
Pi Alpha Phi focuses itself on several core values, which are written into its constitution. The five pillars of the fraternity are: academic excellence, Asian awareness, brotherhood, leadership, and philanthropy.

Academic excellence 
The fraternity creates a studious environment and encourages each of its members to achieve their greatest academic potential. The fraternity supports all educational endeavors and recognizes exceptional academic achievement.

Asian-American Awareness 
The fraternity believes in learning Asian-American culture, heritage, and history. The fraternity encourages its members to pass on this knowledge to others.

Cross-cultural acceptance 
When Pi Alpha Phi was founded in the 1920s, traditional Greek fraternities along with the rest of the nation, legally discriminated against men of color. Since they were banned from joining a traditional Greek fraternity, Pi Alpha Phi's founding fathers wanted to ensure that Asian-American awareness would forever be an important part of the fraternity.

Today, the basic premise of the fraternity remains largely unchanged. Although the fraternity is open to people of all ethnic backgrounds it still retains its Asian-American character. With an emphasis on brotherhood, the fraternity works to create lifelong bonds that extend far beyond the university setting. The basic goals of brotherhood attained through shared experience, friendship and academics remain unaltered. Although the organization evolves from generation to generation, the underlying vision and heart of the fraternity are as solid today as it was for six young Berkeley men in 1926.

Chinese Historical Society of Southern California 
Established in 1975, a non-profit organization dedicated to bringing together people with a common interest in the history of Chinese and Chinese Americans in Southern California. The Society conducts research, collects materials and artifacts, and disseminates information.
Pi Alpha Phi Alumnus is mentioned quite a few times in this book.
Refer to the Notable Alumni section.

San Francisco Chinese New Year Parade 
From the mid-1980s to the early 2000s, Pi Alpha
Phi was a mainstay in the parade, operating what had
affectionately become known as the “Pi Alpha Phi
Dragon”.
It was an event that truly exemplified the close bonds
of brotherhood among the chapters of the fraternity:
an opportunity for fraternity members all over to come
together, have fun, and celebrate a cultural tradition.

Since 2002, due to several factors including the retiring
of our dragon as well as criteria changes for
participating organizations, the fraternity has not
participated in the parade.

Their efforts were rewarded when the parade committee
graciously extended a parade invitation to Pi Alpha
Phi and its partner the Jade Ribbon Campaign to operate
a Jade Ribbon Dragon.

Philanthropy

The fraternity is committed to its responsibility to serve others and encourages participation in activities for the betterment of not only the Asian-American community but the community as a whole.  One of its national events is the Jade Ribbon Campaign.

Jade Ribbon Campaign

The Jade Ribbon Campaign spreads awareness of the
greatest health disparity between Asian Americans and
white Americans: liver cancer, 80% of which is caused
by chronic hepatitis B infection.

The dragon the fraternity purchased was thought to
have a capacity of only 20 people, but when it was put
together, it was much longer. Although the dragon may
not have been the most elaborate of the parade, it was
definitely the longest, as the crowd surely recognized
as the dragon snaked through the downtown parade
route.

The fraternity members took advantage of our opportunity
by having a great turnout: almost 100 fraternity
members showed up to participate and share in the
bonds of Brotherhood. Running a dragon at the parade
has always been a great opportunity for the fraternity's
members to work together, build the bonds of Brotherhood,
and celebrate cultural traditions. This year, they
were also able to support a great philanthropic cause:
the Jade Ribbon Campaign.

Brotherhood
The fraternity encourages mutual trust, respect, and loyalty among its members. The fraternity creates an extended family that nurtures lifelong "friendships" through the shared bonds of tradition, shared values, and unity.

National Conventions

First Annual - Arcadia, CA (Embassy Suites) - hosted by Epsilon chapter, UC Riverside CA
2001 - San Francisco, CA - hosted by Alpha chapter, UC Berkeley, CA
2002 - Los Angeles, CA (Bonaventure Hotel) hosted by Epsilon chapter, UC Riverside, CA
2003 - Irvine, CA -  hosted by Eta chapter, UC Irvine, CA
2004 - San Francisco, CA - hosted by Alpha chapter, UC Berkeley, CA
2005 - Koreatown, CA - hosted by Theta chapter, UC San Diego, CA
2006 - Las Vegas, NV - hosted by Kappa chapter, U of Arizona
2007 - Orange County, CA - hosted by Eta chapter, UC Irvine, CA
2008 - Berkeley, CA hosted by Alpha chapter, UC Berkeley, CA
2009 - San Diego, CA - hosted by Theta chapter, UC San Diego, CA
2010 - San Francisco, CA - hosted by National Fraternity
2011 - Berkeley, CA - hosted by National Fraternity
2014 - Raleigh, NC - hosted by Colony chapter, North Carolina State, NC
2015 - Evanston, IL - hosted by Colony chapter, Northwestern, IL
2016 - Las Vegas, NV - hosted by National Fraternity
2017 - Santa Barbara, CA - hosted by Omicron chapter, UC Santa Barbara, CA
2018 - Chicago, IL - hosted by National Fraternity
2019 - Chinatown, Oakland, CA - hosted by National Fraternity

Joint Conventions

2002 - Joint Convention with Alpha Phi Gamma sorority
2003 - Joint Convention with alpha Kappa Delta Phi sorority
2008 - Joint Convention & Leadership Workshop with Sigma Omicron Pi sorority
2020 - Joint Convention cancelled due to COVID-19.

Leadership
The fraternity provides opportunities to fulfill important duties within the organization and helps members develop leadership skills in preparation for their future careers and endeavors.

Chapters
Active chapters listed in bold. Inactive chapters listed in italic.

Notable alumni

Delbert Wong — Retired Superior Court judge, World War II veteran. First person of Chinese descent to be appointed to the judiciary in the continental United States. Appointed as the special master in the O.J. Simpson murder trial.
Evan Jackson Leong — filmmaker, director of Linsanity, "Forging a Feature: The Journey of BLT", “Better Luck Tomorrow", "Finishing the Game: The Search for a New Bruce Lee",The Fast and "the Furious: Tokyo Drift"

References

http://www.legacy.com/obituaries/sfgate/obituary.aspx?n=ralph-fong&pid=144335993&fhid=5486

External links

Websites
Official Online Home of Pi Alpha Phi
Chinese Historical Society of Southern California
Brian Gee IMDB

News Articles
Asian-Nation, September 29, 2005
Arizona Daily Wildcat, February 17, 2006

Asian-American culture in California
Fraternities and sororities in the United States
Asian-American fraternities and sororities
Philanthropic organizations based in the United States
Organizations based in California
University of California, Berkeley
1929 establishments in California
Student organizations established in 1929